The ECV3 is a concept car developed by British Leyland's BL Technology division, led by Spen King. The ECV3 was first shown to the public in December 1982, and was the third in a series of Energy Conservation Vehicles that BL was developing, incorporating new engine technologies and construction materials. The prototype is on display at the Gaydon Heritage Motor Centre.

Technical details
The ECV3 was powered by an experimental 3-cylinder, 12-valve 1.1 L (1113 cc) petrol engine, developing  @ 5,800 rpm and torque of  @ 3,750 rpm, and mated to a manual 5-speed transmission. The engine was a lightweight 84 kg.

While the engine did not reach production, it did lead to the design of the 1988 K-Series engine.

The car is built using an aluminium spaceframe chassis, co-developed with Alcan, and was the first ever bonded structure, and the body incorporates flexible plastic body panels made of polyurethane reinforced reaction injection moulding (PU-RRIM). The design of the five-door hatchback was unconventional, but resulted in a low .

The prototype also demonstrated packaging efficiency, being a short  supermini sized car, but offering family car sized accommodation.

References

ECV3